Peter Soberlak (born May 12, 1969 in Trail, British Columbia) is a former professional ice hockey left winger. He was drafted in the first round, 21st overall, by the Edmonton Oilers in the 1987 NHL Entry Draft. He never played in the National Hockey League, however.

Career statistics

External links

1969 births
Canadian ice hockey left wingers
Cape Breton Oilers players
Edmonton Oilers draft picks
Ice hockey people from British Columbia
Kamloops Blazers players
Living people
National Hockey League first-round draft picks
Sportspeople from Kamloops
Swift Current Broncos players